is a city located in Mie Prefecture, Japan. , the city had an estimated population of 141,045 in 60,301 households and a population density of 1000 persons per km².

Geography
Kuwana is located in northern Mie Prefecture, facing the Pacific Ocean. It is located at the mouth of Kiso Three Rivers dividing Mie and Aichi Prefectures, the city has functioned as a regional center of fishing, industry, business, and culture.

Neighboring municipalities
Mie Prefecture
Yokkaichi
Inabe
Kisosaki
Tōin
Asahi
Kawagoe
Aichi Prefecture
Aisai
Yatomi
Gifu Prefecture
Kaizu

Climate
Kuwana has a Humid subtropical climate (Köppen Cfa) characterized by warm summers and cool winters with light to no snowfall.

 Temperature: Maximum  (August 3, 2018), Minimum  (February 4, 1999)
 Precipitation: Maximum  (September 11, 2000)
 Instantaneous wind speed: Maximum 27.8 meters/second (September 4, 2018)

Demographics
Per Japanese census data, the population of Kuwana has increased steadily over the past 60 years.

History
The poet Socho described it in 1515 as a major city with over a thousand houses, temples and inns. During the Sengoku period, the area came under the control of the warlord Oda Nobunaga. The Sieges of Nagashima took place in 1571, 1573 and 1574, finally resulting in the destruction of the Ikkō-ikki by Nobunaga's forces. After Nobunaga's death, the area came under the control of Toyotomi Hideyoshi, who initially installed Nobunaga's younger son Oda Nobukatsu as ruler as all of Ise Province. However, following the Battle of Odawara, Hideyoshi demoted Oda Nobukatsu, divided Ise Province into several domains, was assigned to Ujiie Yukihiro as a 22,000 koku domain in 1595. Ujiie Yukihiro sided with the pro-Toyotomi armies in the Battle of Sekigahara and was dispossessed by Tokugawa Ieyasu. 

Under the Tokugawa shogunate, Kuwana was the castle town of Kuwana Domain, with a kokudaka of 150,000 koku. It was also the location of Kuwana-juku, as the forty-second post station on the vital Tōkaidō highway connecting Edo with Kyoto. Some travelers along the road would take ships and boats across Ise Bay from Miya-juku (located in present-day Nagoya near Atsuta Shrine) to Kuwana, which reportedly made the journey more enjoyable. As the trip across Ise Bay took a whole day, Kuwana became a necessary stop for most travelers, benefiting the city's numerous inns and restaurants which served fresh sea food. Kuwana was especially known for its clams. The shogunate recognized the strategic value of the location as both a seaport, and the domain was always ruled by a fudai daimyō, and from 1823 by the shinpan  daimyō Hisamatsu clan.  Matsudaira Sadaaki, the next-to-last daimyō of Kuwana served as the last Kyoto shoshidai and supported his brother, Matsudaira Katamori, daimyō of Aizu Domain. He fought in the Boshin War, finally surrendering to the Meiji government after the fall of the Republic of Ezo. With the abolition of the han system in July 1871 after the Meiji restoration, Kuwana Domain became “Kuwana Prefecture”, and later became Kuwana District within Mie Prefecture.

The area re-established itself as a regional commercial center and was noted for its metal casting industry. Kuwana Town was established in April 1889 with the establishment of the modern municipalities system. It was raised to city status on April 1, 1937, as a result of a merger between existing towns and villages in the area. The city was devastated by Allied air raids on July 17 and July 24, 1945, during World War II, which destroyed some 90% of its urban area. Portions of the city were again heavily damaged in 1959 by the Isewan Typhoon.

On December 6, 2004, the towns of Nagashima and Tado (both from Kuwana District) were merged into Kuwana.

Government
Kuwana has a mayor-council form of government with a directly elected mayor and a unicameral city council of 26 members. Kuwana contributes four members to the Mie Prefectural Assembly. In terms of national politics, the city is part of Mie 3rd district of the lower house of the Diet of Japan.

Economy
Traditionally, Kuwana has been noted for its metal casting industry, which remains an important factor in the local economy, especially with the production on manhole covers and gratings. Another traditional industry that Kuwana was famous for was the production of Banko ware ceramics, and for its woodworking industries, including the production of wooden trays and furniture. Commercial fishing, especially the farming of hamaguri clams is also an important industry.  Today, the city functions as a bed town for nearby Nagoya and Yokkaichi. A large housing estate called Ōyamada (大山田) is located west of central Kuwana.

Education
Kuwana has 27 public elementary schools and nine public middle schools operated by the city government and four public high schools operated by the Mie Prefectural Department of Education. There are also one private elementary school, middle school and high school. The prefecture also operates one special education school for the handicapped..

Transportation

Railway
 JR Tōkai –Kansai Main Line
 -  
 Kintetsu Railway –  Nagoya Line
 - 
 Yōrō Railway – Yōrō Line
  -   -  -  - 
 Sangi Railway – Hokusei Line
 -   -   -   -  -   -

Highway
 Higashi-Meihan Expressway
 Isewangan Expressway

Local attractions

Places of interest 

 Nagashima Spa Land
 Tado Shrine
 Kiso Sansen National Government Park
 Mount Tado
 Nabana no Sato, famous for its illuminations

Festivals 
 Ishidori Matsuri
 Tado Festival

Famous products 
 Hamaguri (Oriental clam) dishes
 Carp dishes

Sister city relations
  Tomamae, Hokkaidō since September, 1981
  Gyōda, Saitama since November 9, 1998
  Shirakawa, Fukushima since November 9, 1998

Notable people

 Tatsumi Naofumi, samurai, general of the Imperial Japanese Army
 Toyama Atsuko, bureucrat and diplomat
 Toshihiko Seko, long-distance runner
 Tsugio Matsuda, racing driver
 Katsuyori Shibata, professional wrestler
 Hirooki Goto, professional wrestler
 Koji Iwamoto, professional wrestler
 Hiroki Shimowada, voice actor
 Mikako Komatsu, voice actress

References

External links

 
 Kuwana City official website 
 Kuwana-city Tourist guide (Kuwana City) 
 Travel brochure (Kuwana City) 
 Kuwana: Shichiri Crossing from the series Fifty-three Stations of the Tōkaidō, by Utagawa Hiroshige (Ukiyo-e Search) 

Cities in Mie Prefecture
Port settlements in Japan
Populated coastal places in Japan
Kuwana, Mie